Pico das Torres is the second highest peak on the Atlantic island of Madeira, Portugal.

References

Torres
Geography of Madeira
Torres